The Pug Awards were a Toronto architecture award that rated buildings based on popular votes, awarded annually from 2004 to 2014. Each spring, the Pug Awards website listed all buildings completed the previous year in Toronto that either had more than 50,000 feet of floor space or were deemed noteworthy by the Pug Awards Advisory Board and Executive Committee, with voters able to “Love”, “Like” or “Hate” new developments. In 2009, buildings outside the Old City of Toronto (including North York and Etobicoke) became eligible for awards. The awards were created in 2004 by Gary Berman and Anna Simone . They were originally named the "Fugly Awards" and highlighted the ugliest buildings completed, but the name was then softened to the Puglies, and finally to the Pugs, with a Pug dog as the mascot. In 2008 the awards introduced the "Pug Cup," which was carved each year with the winning building and displayed at City Hall.

2014 awards
Best residential: River City
Best commercial/institutional: Bridgepoint Active Healthcare
Paul Oberman Award commercial/institutional: Bridgepoint Active Healthcare

2013 awards
Best residential: 500 Wellington West
Best commercial/institutional: 11 Division, Toronto Police Services
Paul Oberman Award commercial/institutional: 11 Division, Toronto Police Services
Worst residential: Palais at Port Royal Place
Worst commercial/institutional: Trump International Hotel & Tower

2012 awards
Best residential: 83 Redpath
Best commercial/institutional: The Centre for Green Cities, Evergreen Brick Works
Paul Oberman Award commercial/institutional: The Shops of Summerhill
Worst residential: Pearl Condominium
Worst commercial/institutional: Toronto Rehab University Centre, Patient Care & Research Tower

2011 awards
Best residential: Seventy5 Portland
Best commercial/institutional: Bell Lightbox
Paul Oberman Award commercial/institutional: Bloor/Gladstone Library
Paul Oberman Award residential: The Printing Factory Lofts
Worst residential: Eleven Christie
Worst commercial/institutional: Scarborough Gospel Temple

2010 awards
Best residential: 60 Richmond East Housing Co-Operative
Best commercial/institutional: Telus Centre at The Royal Conservatory of Music
Worst residential: Grande Triomphe – Phase II
Worst commercial/institutional: Shops at Don Mills

2009 awards
Best residential: One Saint Thomas - Robert A.M. Stern
Best commercial/institutional: Art Gallery of Ontario - Frank Gehry
Worst residential: Hampton Plaza
Worst commercial/institutional: Mount Sinai Hospital Joseph & Wolf Lebovic Centre

2008 awards
Best residential: Argyle Authentic Lofts
Best commercial/institutional: Hazelton Hotel
Worst residential: 76 Shuter
Worst commercial/institutional: Marriott Residence Inn

2007 awards
Best residential: One King West
Best commercial/institutional: Gardiner Museum
Worst residential: Be Bloor Condominium
Worst commercial/institutional: Ryerson School of Business

2006 awards
Best residential: 18 Yorkville
Best commercial/institutional: National Ballet School of Canada
Worst residential: Glenlake
Worst commercial/institutional: Cosmopolitan Hotel

2005 awards
Best residential: Waterclub I
Best commercial/institutional: Toronto Police Service's 51 Division
Worst residential: Wellington Square
Worst commercial/institutional: Queen Elizabeth Centre (Toronto Rehab)

See also
Architecture of Toronto

External links
Official site

References

Goldberg, Brianna."Low-rise lofts triumph at annual Pug Awards." National Post. Don Mills, Ont.: Jun 5, 2008. pg. A.15
Ouellette, Robert. "How the Pug Awards saved Toronto." National Post. Don Mills, Ont.: May 2, 2008. pg. A.10
Hume, Christopher. "So T.O. who's the Pugliest of them all?" Toronto Star. Toronto, Ont.: Jun 7, 2006. pg. B.04

Architecture awards
Culture of Toronto